Pierre Michon Bourdelot (2 February 1610 in Sens – 9 February 1685) was a French physician, anatomist, libertine and freethinker.

Life 

Bourdelot studied at the Sorbonne (1629) and travelled in 1634 to Rome in the company of count François de Noailles. In 1638 he came back to France and was appointed as the private doctor of the Condé family. In 1640 he founded the Académie Bourdelot, a circle for scientists, philosophers and authors, that came together twice a month. When his uncle died, he inherited a lot of books and manuscripts. When Louis II de Bourbon, prince de Condé, because of actions during the Fronde against Absolutism, was captured by Mazarin, he took off; in 1652 he was in Stockholm. Bourdelot took many manuscripts with him as a present. He had a lot of influence on her with his jokes and poems by Pietro Aretino. Within four weeks she seems to have been recovered and enjoying life. Magnus Gabriel de la Gardie and Christina's mother Maria Eleonora of Brandenburg were shocked by his behavior and Bourdelot returned to France in 1653 with many presents.
Bourdelot was friends with Jacques Stella, Gabriel Naudé, and Nicolas Poussin.

Works (selection) 
 1671:  (C. Barbin, Paris).
 1672:  (T. Moette, Paris)
 1715: … (Paris, 1715); published by his nephews.

References

Literature 
 Robert Mortimer Gascoigne (1987). A Chronology of the History of Science, 1450–1900, Garland (New York) : xi + 585 p. .
 Katia Béguin, "L’académie du Grand Condé". In: Actes du Coll. Règlement, usage et science dans la France de l’absolutisme (1999), éd. Tec et Doc, Paris.

17th-century French physicians
1610 births
1685 deaths
University of Paris alumni
Court of Christina, Queen of Sweden